Keleher is a surname. Notable people with the surname include:

James Patrick Keleher (born 1931), American Roman Catholic bishop
Julia Keleher (born 1974), American educational leader

See also
Kelleher